Joshua Johnson (January 25, 1914 – August 12, 1999), nicknamed "Brute", was an American Negro league catcher who played between 1934 and 1940.

A native of Evergreen, Alabama, Johnson attended Pennsylvania State College. He broke into the Negro leagues in 1934 with the Homestead Grays, and played for the Grays, the Cincinnati Tigers, and the New York Black Yankees. Johnson served in the US Army during World War II, and died in Springfield, Illinois in 1999 at age 85.

References

External links
 and Baseball-Reference Black Baseball stats and Seamheads

1914 births
1999 deaths
Cincinnati Tigers players
Homestead Grays players
New York Black Yankees players
20th-century African-American sportspeople
Baseball catchers